The 2000 Italian Open also known as 2000 Rome Masters was a tennis tournament played on outdoor clay courts. It was the 57th edition of the Italian Open, and was part of the ATP Masters Series of the 2000 ATP Tour, and of the Tier I Series of the 2000 WTA Tour. Both the men's and the women's events took place at the Foro Italico in Rome, Italy. The men's tournament was played from May 8 through May 14, 2000 and the women's tournament was played from May 15 through May 21, 2000.

Finals

Men's singles

 Magnus Norman defeated  Gustavo Kuerten 6–3, 4–6, 6–4, 6–4
It was Magnus Norman's 2nd title of the year and his 9th overall. It was his 1st Masters title.

Women's singles

 Monica Seles defeated  Amélie Mauresmo 6–2, 7–6
It was Monica Seles' 3rd title of the year and her 47th overall. It was her 1st Tier I title of the year and her 9th overall.

Men's doubles

 Martin Damm /  Dominik Hrbatý defeated  Wayne Ferreira /  Yevgeny Kafelnikov 6–4, 3–6, 6–4

Women's doubles

 Lisa Raymond /  Rennae Stubbs defeated  Arantxa Sánchez Vicario /  Magüi Serna 6–3, 4–6, 6–2

References

External links
Official website

Italian Open
Italian Open
 
Italian Open
2000 Italian Open (Tennis)